Before There Were Slackers There Were... is a collection of recordings from 1992, 1994, and 1995 by The Slackers under the pseudonym, The Nods. Despite common misconception, the band was already known as The Slackers when this material was recorded and several of the tracks had previously appeared on their demo tapes. The pseudonym was used due to the album being self-released during the time that the Slackers were first signed to Hellcat Records.

Track listing
 "Trash"  – 3:20
 "All I Ever Wanted"  – 3:50
 "You Don't Know I..."  – 2:39
 "Ray-Gun Sally"  – 3:02
 "Dead Girl"  – 3:36
 "Gasoline"  – 2:47
 "Dear Bossman"  – 3:03
 "Andre"  – 2:58
 "Sleep Outside"  – 3:36
 "Bed Bug"  – 3:26
 "Red Onions"  – 2:36
 "Rude Boy"  – 4:22
 "Sister Sister"  – 2:26
 "Greedy Girl"  – 4:26
 "Tarantula"  – 2:41
 "Yuk-Yah"  – 5:36

1999 compilation albums
The Slackers compilation albums